Balzani is a surname. Notable people with the surname include:

Annarita Balzani (born 1967), Italian sprinter
Roberto Balzani (born 1961), Italian historian, professor and politician
Ugo Balzani (1847–1916), Italian historian
Vincenzo Balzani (born 1936), Italian chemist

See also
Balzano